Relapse is an EP by British rock band Oceansize, released in October 2002 on Beggars Banquet Records.  It was produced by Tim Smith of the band Cardiacs, and Sel Balamir of the band Amplifier contributed to mixing.  Two of the EP's tracks, "Amputee" and "You Wish", were re-recorded in 2003 for Effloresce.  An earlier version of "Relapse" appeared as "Ebb" on the Amputee EP.

Track listing 
 "Amputee" - 5:08
 "Relapse" - 10:14
 "You Wish" - 6:55

Personnel 
 Tim Smith - producer
 Elliot James - mixer
 Sel Balamir - mixer
 Mike Vennart - guitar, vocals
 Steve Durose - guitar, backing vocals
 Gambler - guitar, keyboards
 Jon Ellis - bass
 Mark Heron - drums

2002 EPs
Oceansize albums
Beggars Banquet Records EPs